Om Prakash Dhurve (born 13 May 1964) in Rusa village, Dindori district is an Indian politician from Madhya Pradesh. He is a member of Bharatiya Janata Party and a member of Madhya Pradesh Legislative Assembly at Shahpura constituency from 2013 to December 2018. He lost the 2018 Madhya Pradesh Assembly election from Shahpura against the candidate of Congress.

Political life
He served as Food, Civil Supplies and Consumer Protection, Social Welfare, SC and ST Welfare, Women and Child Development and later Tribal Welfare, Labour, Sports and Youth Welfare Minister of the state under Uma Bharti, Babulal Gaur and Shivraj Singh Chouhan. He was inducted to Cabinet Ministry of Shivraj Singh Chouhan as Minister of Food, Civil Supplies and Consumer Protection, Labour in June 2016.

References

Bharatiya Janata Party politicians from Madhya Pradesh
State cabinet ministers of Madhya Pradesh
Living people
1964 births
People from Dindori
Madhya Pradesh MLAs 2013–2018
Madhya Pradesh MLAs 1990–1992
Madhya Pradesh MLAs 1998–2003
Madhya Pradesh MLAs 2003–2008